The 1946 Saint Mary's Gaels football team was an American football team that represented Saint Mary's College of California during the 1946 college football season. In their fifth season under head coach James Phelan, the Gaels compiled a 6–3 record and were outscored by opponents by a combined total of 229 to 160.

The team was led on offense by Herman Wedemeyer who ranked seventh in the nation with 1,220 yards of total offense -- 625 rushing yards and 595 passing yards. He was selected by both the United Press and the Associated Press as a first-team halfback on the 1946 All-Pacific Coast football team. In 1979, Wedemeyer was inducted into the College Football Hall of Fame.

Schedule

After the season

The 1947 NFL Draft was held on December 16, 1946. The following Gael was selected.

References

Saint Mary's
Saint Mary's Gaels football seasons
Saint Mary's Gaels football